Summit Township, Nebraska may refer to the following places:

Summit Township, Burt County, Nebraska
Summit Township, Butler County, Nebraska

See also

Summit Township (disambiguation)

Nebraska township disambiguation pages